The Southern California Railway Museum (SCRM, reporting mark OERX), formerly known as the Orange Empire Railway Museum, is a railroad museum in Perris, California, United States. It was founded in 1956 at Griffith Park in Los Angeles before moving to the former Pinacate Station as the "Orange Empire Trolley Museum" in 1958. It was renamed "Orange Empire Railway Museum" in 1975 after merging with a museum then known as the California Southern Railroad Museum, and adopted its current name in 2019. The museum also operates a heritage railroad on the museum grounds.

Background
The collection focuses on Southern California's railroad history. It houses the largest collection of Pacific Electric Railway rolling stock in the world, much of it rescued from scrapyards after the discontinuation of their passenger operations in 1961.

Its main line stretches from south of the museum northward towards the junction with the BNSF Railway, where the historic Perris Depot on State Route 74 stands. The BNSF Railway spur is in active use, but the museum track onto the spur is currently severed due to Metrolink service, meaning that no museum trains can access the Perris Depot. A Pacific Electric interurban "Red Car" also operates on the mainline on selected weekends, but the line electrification ends a block south of the depot. Streetcars and locomotives are selected on a rotating basis. The museum maintains a steam locomotive in operating condition and its use is scheduled for each third weekend, September through May, certain special events and major holidays.

Parking and admission to the museum are free except for special events. Tickets must be purchased to ride on the museum railway. Tickets are good for the day on all operating equipment on the line, including the streetcar loop.

Tours of the grounds, static exhibits and shops can be self-guided or with a docent. A picnic area is located near the main entrance as is an interactive railroad "signal garden."

Interactive signal garden
Built between 2000 and 2001 and utilizing a combination of standard railroad signal relays and custom microprocessor controls, the garden's first phase included:
Two restored Magnetic Flagman grade crossing signals, both upper- and lower-quadrant
Safetran V20 tri-light block signal, a new signal originally installed on the Southern Pacific Coastal Route and removed from service for standardization purposes by its successor, the Union Pacific Railroad
Union Switch and Signal motorcar indicators which were miniature semaphores designed to warn maintenance crews of oncoming trains
Union Switch and Signal motorcar indicator as used by the ATSF; this was little more than a pair of electric lamps and colored lenses
Grade crossing warning bell . This is a large, bronze bell with an electromagnetically driven clapper which alerted motorists to the approach of a train. It stood at an SP grade crossing in nearby Anaheim until the early 1960s when it was donated to the museum
Union Switch and Signal relay cabinet,  and used to house the electronics powering the exhibits

The display has since been expanded to include modern grade crossing signals, a US&S semaphore which once was mounted on a signal bridge spanning the Pacific Electric Watts Line and a century-old US&S banjo signal, used for both grade crossing protection and train control and one of only three known to exist. The others are on display at the Baltimore and Ohio Museum and the Smithsonian Institution.

Notable exhibits
The Emma Nevada, a  narrow gauge Baldwin Locomotive Works 2-6-0 "Mogul" steam locomotive built in 1881, was purchased by Disney animator Ward Kimball, and his spouse, Betty, for the Grizzly Flats Railroad in San Gabriel, California that they created at their southern California residence in 1938. During his life, Kimball was most known as being one of Walt Disney's "Nine Old Men," a core group of longtime animators who were extremely influential in defining the Disney style and shaping various Disney productions. Originally built for the short-line Nevada Central Railway connecting Battle Mountain with Austin, the beautifully restored locomotive features Kimball's own artwork on the cab and headlight and was finally fired up in 1942. Boiler problems permanently sidelined the Emma Nevada in 1951 when neighbors complained about the smoke. Kimball donated the locomotive to the museum, and it can be seen today in the museum's Grizzly Flats car barn. The love of trains that Kimball shared with Walt Disney, and with fellow animator, Ollie Johnston, partly inspired Walt Disney's creation of the turn-of-the-19th Century Disneyland Railroad on Main Street, U.S.A., at The Magic Kingdom, when it opened to the world in 1955. Of the five steam-powered engines that the Disneyland Railroad operates, a restored 1902 Baldwin  narrow-gauge locomotive was named in recognition of Kimball, who was also designated a "Disney Legend" by The Walt Disney Company before his passing. Engine No. 5, the Ward Kimball, entered service at the D.R.R. on June 26, 2005. The piece is the first and only locomotive to be added to the railway since 1959.

In addition to the "Emma Nevada," the Chloe, a  narrow gauge Baldwin Locomotive Works 0-4-2T steam locomotive built in 1883, was also owned by Kimball, and the engine is also on display at the museum.  Neither are operational; however, a diesel switcher is used to move the locomotives up and down the museum's short segment of  narrow gauge track on select days. On July 28, 2017, the Chloe and its train car made an appearance at the media preview for the reopening of the Disneyland Railroad. They were pulled along its new route by the Justi Creek Railway's Marie E. locomotive driven by John Lasseter. The SCRM plans to restore the Chloe to operating condition. The Hillcrest Shops in Reedley, California, was selected as the location for the locomotive's restoration.
The museum's newest locomotive, Santa Fe 108, is a 1967 EMD FP45 diesel locomotive. ATSF 108 is especially notable as being the last passenger locomotive ever purchased by the Atchison, Topeka and Santa Fe Railway and was used on Santa Fe's finest passenger trains, including the Super Chief between Chicago and Los Angeles. Relegated to fast freight service in 1971 when passenger rail operations were transferred to Amtrak, the FP45 was donated in operating condition less its air conditioner by the Burlington Northern Santa Fe in 1997, but its size limits its use to occasional demonstration service and special excursions. It is maintained in service-ready condition and is sometimes used on off-property work trains. The locomotive underwent an extensive six-year restoration which was completed in late 2018. The completed restoration returned the locomotive to its as delivered external arrangement, including the original Santa Fe passenger Warbonnet paint scheme and original number.
Southern Pacific 3100 is a GE U25B diesel locomotive once owned by the Southern Pacific Railroad and is the last operating example left in the US. Built in 1963 and originally numbered 7508, it became one of three SP locomotives painted in a red, white and blue color scheme in 1976 in celebration of the United States Bicentennial. It was retired in 1987. Numbered as SP 3100 prior to being donated, this locomotive is used in regular service. Like the FP45, the U25B is certified to run on any railroad, and its two-axle trucks and 2500-horsepower (1.9 MW) prime mover make it ideal for off-property work trains. It is also used to pull passenger-carrying freight cars on weekends and during members-only events, may be operated by museum members under supervision by a qualified engineer.
The Union Pacific E-8A 942 built by General Motors' Electro-Motive Division in 1953. It is one of 18 UP cars and locomotives preserved at the museum. The 942 is the flagship of the museum's UP fleet. It has been fully mechanically and cosmetically restored to UP's traditional yellow paint scheme with red and grey accents. The locomotive is occasionally used to lead a matching four car passenger train consist, nicknamed “The City of Perris”, playing on Union Pacific's practice of christening certain named trains after cities they originated from. Example: City of Los Angeles, City of San Francisco. The consist runs on select weekends, and occasionally for special events.
The Pacific Electric collection consists of over 30 pieces of equipment from the largest interurban network in the United States, including local, suburban and interurban passenger equipment, electric locomotives, cabooses, and freight cars. Included are "Business Car" PE 1000, and interurban PE 1001, built in 1913 by Jewett; PE 1299, a 1929 "Business Car" rebuilt from a 1912 Pullman-built Southern Pacific trailer; three giant "Blimp" interurban coaches; several "Hollywood" suburban cars (featured in the film Who Framed Roger Rabbit), and two Birney streetcars.
The Los Angeles Railway collection consists of over two dozen pieces of electric railway equipment and is the most comprehensive collection of preserved equipment from any large city streetcar system. Highlights of the collection, which includes examples of nearly every type of streetcar run in Los Angeles in the 20th century as well as numerous work cars, include the "Descanso", the only surviving street railway funeral car; car 3001, christened by Shirley Temple as the first PCC streetcar in Los Angeles; and several examples of the "California" type of streetcar that utilized a half-open design suitable to the warm climate. Cars are operated regularly over the only  narrow gauge trolley line remaining in the United States.
Ventura County Railway #2 is a 1922 Baldwin Locomotive Works 2-6-2 steam locomotive maintained in operating condition. Originally built to run on coal, the locomotive was converted to oil soon after delivery to its original purchaser, the Cascade Timber Company of Reliance, Washington as No. 107. Last used by the V.C. Ry. on an excursion run in 1959, it was put up for sale in 1962, sold to a private party in 1964, and finally, it was transferred to the California Southern Railroad Museum in 1972, one of the SCRM's predecessors. The boiler was overhauled to present-day FRA steam locomotive regulations in 2001–2006; bringing the rest of the locomotive to specifications has been ongoing since its acquisition. In November 2021, the locomotive was taken out of service for a federally-mandated inspection and overhaul. Every 15 years or 1472 service days, whichever comes first, this process must be repeated. The overhaul and inspection is estimated to take three to five years to complete, and is estimated to cost $200,000. Updates and progress can be followed on the museum's official steam shop Facebook page.
Santa Fe #5704 is one of 5 ATSF SD45-2s to be painted in the Bicentennial scheme, originally built in 1973 by Electro-Motive Division. The locomotive was donated to the museum in 2021 by BNSF. In 2022, the locomotive was cosmetically restored to its as-built appearance at Mid-America Car in Kansas City, Missouri. 5704 is not currently in operating condition, but the museum plans to restore it to working order once it arrives on museum property. The locomotive is expected to arrive at the museum in 2023.

Light rail vehicles
San Diego Trolley Siemens-Duewag U2 cars 1008 and 1003 arrived in March 2016 and March 2018 (respectively), joining original San Diego Electric Railway PCC cars 508 and 528 as part of the San Diego collection. The 1008 and 1003 operate on select weekends at the museum independently, and occasionally as a two-car train.
Los Angeles Metro Rail Nippon Sharyo P865 car 144 is the newest light rail arrival to the museum, joining the collection in July 2018. The 144 is currently the only non-Boeing and non-Siemens Light Rail Vehicle preserved in a museum in the United States.

Shop and maintenance facilities 
In addition to the museum's railroad equipment exhibits, its shops hold a historic collection of industrial machine tools and hand tools.  One of these is a sheet-metal shear, which was made by Parker Manufacturing Company, a machine shop in Santa Monica, CA.  The company needed a shear, but backlogs in the World War II years meant a two-year waiting list to obtain one.  So, the small company decided to design and make its own shear.  It was made entirely of steel plate (no castings) due to backlogs in foundries.  The design was successful, and desired by other shops needing machine tools.  Soon, the local company was in the shear manufacturing business.  The museum puts this unique shear to use in its Car house 4.

Other shop and maintenance facilities at the museum include:

 Machine Shop, capable of custom machining and metalwork operations, this fully equipped shop is frequently used to recreate custom parts for maintenance of rolling stock and projects. The machine shop also houses the air brake shop.
 Wood Shop, equipped for precision woodworking to help maintain facilities and rolling stock with wooden components.
 Communications, Electronics & LRV Maintenance Shop maintains the museum's railway radio communications system along with other electronics-based systems, and also maintains the museum's fleet of Light Rail Vehicles, as these vehicles are highly electronics-based.
 Signal Shop, maintains the railway signal system including all track switches, controllers, CTC systems, relays, automatic block signaling, track circuits and associated equipment.
 Diesel Maintenance Shop maintains the railway's fleet of diesel locomotives and associated diesel engines.
 Electric car maintenance is performed in workshops located in car houses 1 and 2, for narrow-gauge and standard-gauge cars respectively.

Gallery

See also
List of heritage railroads in the United States
List of heritage railways
List of museums in California
Perris Valley Historical and Museum Association
Rail transport in Walt Disney Parks and Resorts
Railroad Canyon

References

Bibliography

External links

 Official Website

Heritage railroads in California
Museums established in 1956
Museums in Riverside County, California
Perris, California
Railroad museums in California
1956 establishments in California
Street railway museums in the United States